Kuppiyawatta West Grama Niladhari Division is a Grama Niladhari Division of the Thimbirigasyaya Divisional Secretariat  of Colombo District  of Western Province, Sri Lanka .

Dharmasoka College, Ananda College, National Hospital of Sri Lanka, Ceylon Medical College, Nalanda College, Colombo, Panchikawatte, Ministry of Health, Nutrition and Indigenous Medicine, Carey College, Colombo, Zahira College, Colombo and Maradana  are located within, nearby or associated with Kuppiyawatta West.

Kuppiyawatta West is a surrounded by the Maradana, Ibbanwala, Maligakanda, Borella North, Kuppiyawatta East and Kurunduwatta  Grama Niladhari Divisions.

Demographics

Ethnicity 

The Kuppiyawatta West Grama Niladhari Division has a Sinhalese majority (58.3%) and a significant Moor population (32.0%) . In comparison, the Thimbirigasyaya Divisional Secretariat (which contains the Kuppiyawatta West Grama Niladhari Division) has a Sinhalese majority (52.8%), a significant Sri Lankan Tamil population (28.0%) and a significant Moor population (15.1%)

Religion 

The Kuppiyawatta West Grama Niladhari Division has a Buddhist majority (56.2%) and a significant Muslim population (33.2%) . In comparison, the Thimbirigasyaya Divisional Secretariat (which contains the Kuppiyawatta West Grama Niladhari Division) has a Buddhist plurality (47.9%), a significant Hindu population (22.5%) and a significant Muslim population (17.4%)

Grama Niladhari Divisions of Thimbirigasyaya Divisional Secretariat

Gallery

References